Tinbeerwah is a semi-rural locality in the Shire of Noosa, Queensland, Australia.

Geography

Mount Tinbeerwah is located in the north where the Tewantin National Park and Tewantin Forest Reserve have been established.

History

The name Tinbeerwah is Aboriginal for "place of grasstrees" or "high hill climbing up".

Tinbeerwah Provisional School opened on 2 September 1914. On 1 September 1916 it became Tinbeerwah State School. It closed on 9 August 1963.

In 1987 12-year-old Noosa schoolgirl Sian Kingi was raped and murdered in Tinbeerwah after being abducted from Noosa Heads.

Between 2008 and 2013 Tinbeerwah (and the rest of the Shire of Noosa) was within Sunshine Coast Region but the Shire of Noosa was re-established in 2014.

At the  the locality recorded a population of 1,262.

References

External links

 

Suburbs of Noosa Shire, Queensland
Localities in Queensland